The Constitution of 1879 was an abortive attempt by the prime minister to promulgate a constitution for Egypt in 1879.  It failed when the khedive, Isma'il Pasha, was toppled  by the British that year.

References

See also
History of the Egyptian Constitution
Egyptian Fundamental Ordinance of 1882
Egyptian Constitution of 1923
Egyptian Constitution of 1930
Egyptian Constitution of 1956
Provisional Constitution of the United Arab Republic of 1958
Egyptian Constitution of 1964 ("Constitution of the United Arab Republic", provisional)
Egyptian Constitution of 1971
Egyptian Constitutional Declaration of 2011 (provisional)
Egyptian Constitution of 2012
Egyptian Constitution of 2014

1879
Constitution of 1879
Constitution of 1879
Defunct constitutions
1879 documents